Cummins Township is a township in Pocahontas County, Iowa, United States. Havelock is contained within Cummins Township.

History 
Cummins Township was organized from part of Washington Township in 1909.

Geography 
Cummins Township has an area of 36.7 square miles, of which 0.02 square miles are water. Its elevation is 1253 feet above sea level. A plover waterfowl production area is located in Cummins Township. Lizard Creek, North Branch Lizard Creek, and Pilot Creek run through Cummins.

Demographics 
As of 2018, Cummins Township had a population of 244 residents, of whom 100% were white.

Government 
Cummins Township is in District 1 of the Pocahontas County Board of Supervisors, which is currently represented by Jeffrey Ives. It is in District 10 of the Iowa General Assembly, currently represented by Republican Mike Sexton and in District 5 of the Iowa Senate, currently represented by Republican Tim Kraayenbrink of District 5. Cummins Township is in of Iowa's 4th congressional district, and its representative in the United States House of Representatives is Republican Randy Feenstra.

Education 
Cummins Township is in the Pocahontas Area Community School District.

References

Townships in Pocahontas County, Iowa
Townships in Iowa